Sob Pressão (English: Under Pressure) is a Brazilian medical drama television series created by Luiz Noronha, Cláudio Torres, Renato Fagundes and Jorge Furtado based on the 2016 film of the same name (which was inspired by the Márcio Maranhão book Sob Pressão: A Rotina de Guerra de Um Médico Brasileiro). The series is a co-production of Conspiração Filmes and TV Globo, and premiered on 25 July 2017, on TV Globo.

The series follows the emergency department doctors and nurses of a precarious public hospital in Rio de Janeiro. Júlio Andrade (Dr. Evandro), Marjorie Estiano (Dr. Carolina) and Stepan Nercessian (Samuel) all reprised their movie roles for the television series.

Production for the first season started at the beginning of March 2017. Filming began 10 April 2017. TV Globo renewed the show for a second season in May 2017, before the first one even started airing. The second season premiered on 9 October 2018.

In May 2018, the series was renewed for a third season.

Plot 
Inside a chaotic emergency room in Rio de Janeiro, a team of doctors are torn between their internal personal conflicts, the difficulties of the profession and the surprising dramas behind each patient's history, in a heroic attempt to save lives. A talented surgeon and a faith-driven doctor will find strength in each other to face this extremely harsh routine.

Cast

Main
 Júlio Andrade as Dr. Evandro Moreira, a skeptical chief surgeon of the medical staff of a public hospital seeking healing for his sick soul
 Marjorie Estiano as  Dr. Carolina Almeida, a religious vascular surgeon who seeks in faith the antidote against all the misery she faces in her daily life 
 Bruno Garcia as Dr. Décio Guedes, a general practitioner
 Stepan Nercessian as Dr. Samuel Fagundes, the hospital's director (seasons 1–2; guest Covid)
 Pablo Sanábio as Dr. Charles Garcia, a resident
 Tatsu Carvalho as Dr. Rafael Albertini, a neurosurgeon (seasons 1–2) 
 Orã Figueiredo as Dr. Amir Salgado, an anesthetist (seasons 1–2)
 Heloísa Jorge as Jaqueline Vaz, a nurse (seasons 1–2)
 Josie Antello as Rosa, the hospital's receptionist
 Alexandre David as Adalberto Santos, the hospital's watchman (seasons 1–2)
 Talita Castro as Kelly Cristina Ribeiro, a nursing technique (season 1)
 Fernanda Torres as Dr. Renata Veiga, a private consultant later nominated as hospital manager (season 2)
 Humberto Carrão as Dr. Henrique Figueira (season 2)
 Julia Shimura as Keiko Yamada, a nurse (season 2–present)
 Drica Moraes as Dr. Vera Lúcia Veiga, an infectologist (season 3–present)
 Marcelo Batista as Dr. Gustavo Lemos, an anesthetist (season 3, 4–present)
 Jana Guinond as Simone Ramos, a nurse (season 3)
 David Junior as Dr. Mauro, a neurosurgeon (Covid–present)
 Roberta Rodrigues as Marisa, a nurse (Covid)
 Bárbara Reis as Lívia, a nurse (season 4–present)

Recurring
 Cridemar Aquino as Paulo, a paramedic
 Luís Melo as José Luiz Almeida, Carolina's father (seasons 1–2) 
 Ângela Rabelo	as Dercília (seasons 1–2) 
 Natália Lage as Madalena Moreira, Evandro's deceased wife (season 1)
 Marcelo Serrado as Roberto, a state government official working at the Secretary of Health (season 2)
 Joana Fomm as Mother Superior Graça (season 3)
 Ana Flávia Cavalcanti as Diana, a drug addict, and later Evandro's affair (season 3–present)

Episodes 
<onlyinclude>

Season 1 (2017)

Season 2 (2018)

Season 3 (2019)

Plantão Covid (2020)

Season 4 (2021)

Release

Broadcast
Sob Pressão premiered on 25 July 2017 on TV Globo in Brazil. In Portugal, the series began airing on 1 December 2017 on RTP1. Teleamazonas acquired the broadcast rights for Ecuador and began airing the series on 4 September 2018. In Italy the series premiered on Sky Atlantic on 3 October 2018. In Argentina, the series began airing on 1 January 2019 on Telefe.

Reception

Viewership 
Aired in Brazil since 25 July, in Globo's late prime time, the series attracts a high audience, reaching an average of more than 38 million viewers per episode.

Awards and nominations

References

External links
Sob Pressão on Gshow.com
 

2017 Brazilian television series debuts
2010s Brazilian television series
Brazilian drama television series
Brazilian medical television series
Brazilian workplace television series
Brazilian thriller television series
Portuguese-language television shows
Television shows set in Rio de Janeiro (city)
Rede Globo original programming
Serial drama television series